Francisco Javier "Javi" Hernández González (born 6 June 1989) is a Spanish professional footballer who plays as an attacking midfielder for Indian Super League club Bengaluru.

Club career
Born in Salamanca, Castile and León, Hernández reached Real Madrid's youth academy in 2005 at the age of 16, signing from local UD Salamanca. He made his senior debut in the 2008–09 season with Real Madrid Castilla in Segunda División B, appearing in 24 games but only starting in three of those.

On 1 February 2011, after having totalled only ten league matches in one and a half seasons, Hernández was loaned to Halmstads BK in Sweden, alongside Castilla teammates Raúl and José Zamora. He returned to his country in the summer, going on to continue competing in the third tier the following years with Salamanca, CD Ourense and Burgos CF.

On 31 August 2016, Hernández joined Górnik Łęczna. On 15 June 2017, he moved to Azerbaijan Premier League club Gabala FK on a one-year contract with an optional second year, but left shortly after and returned to the Polish Ekstraklasa with KS Cracovia.

In August 2019, Hernández signed a deal at ATK of the Indian Super League. He scored twice in his debut campaign to win the national championship, with both of his goals coming in the 3–1 final win over Chennaiyin FC.

After a merger, Hernández agreed to a one-year contract with the newly formed ATK Mohun Bagan FC on 30 September 2020. The following 30 July, he moved to Odisha FC of the same league on a one-year deal. He scored in the latter's first match of the season against Bengaluru FC (3–1 home victory), repeating the feat the following round – through a direct corner kick – as the hosts defeated SC East Bengal 6–4.

Hernández continued in the Indian top division in June 2022, on a two-year contract at Bengaluru FC.

Personal life
Guti, who spent the vast majority of his professional career with Real Madrid, is Hernández's cousin.

Career statistics

Club

Honours
ATK
Indian Super League: 2019–20

Bengaluru
Durand Cup: 2022

References

External links

1989 births
Living people
Sportspeople from Salamanca
Spanish footballers
Footballers from Castile and León
Association football midfielders
Segunda División B players
Real Madrid Castilla footballers
UD Salamanca players
CD Ourense footballers
Burgos CF footballers
Allsvenskan players
Halmstads BK players
Liga I players
ACS Poli Timișoara players
Ekstraklasa players
Górnik Łęczna players
MKS Cracovia (football) players
Gabala FC players
Indian Super League players
ATK (football club) players
ATK Mohun Bagan FC players
Odisha FC players
Bengaluru FC players
Spain youth international footballers
Spanish expatriate footballers
Expatriate footballers in Sweden
Expatriate footballers in Romania
Expatriate footballers in Poland
Expatriate footballers in Azerbaijan
Expatriate footballers in India
Spanish expatriate sportspeople in Sweden
Spanish expatriate sportspeople in Romania
Spanish expatriate sportspeople in Poland
Spanish expatriate sportspeople in Azerbaijan
Spanish expatriate sportspeople in India